The Abarth Classiche 1000 SP is a sports car that will be produced in limited numbers.

It was previewed by the Abarth 1000 SP concept, shown in early 2021, inspired by the original 1966 racing car.

Given that the Classiche 1000 SP is based on the Alfa Romeo 4C, it features the same turbocharged 1.75-liter four-cylinder engine that churns out  at 6,000 rpm. Underpinning the car is the same hybrid chassis as the 4C, complete with a carbon fiber central cell, while the front uses aluminum in its construction.

References

Abarth vehicles
Sports cars